Kim Clijsters defeated Caroline Wozniacki in the final, 7–5, 6–3 to win the women's singles tennis title at the 2009 US Open. It was her second US Open title and her second major singles title overall. She became the first unseeded player and wild card to win the title, and the first mother to win a major since Evonne Goolagong in 1980. Following her win, she appeared at 19th in the rankings. This was the first time since the 2007 Australian Open where Clijsters participated in a major, as she was contesting just her third tournament since coming out of retirement. 

Serena Williams was the defending champion, but was defeated in the semifinals by Clijsters. A foot fault was called for Williams at the end of the second set, producing two match points for Clijsters. Williams argued the call and was given a point penalty for intimidating a line judge, ending the match (having already had a warning for racquet abuse earlier in the match).

Svetlana Kuznetsova's loss in the fourth round guaranteed a first time major finalist from the top half of the draw. Wozniacki became the first Danish woman to reach a major final, and the first Scandinavian to reach the final since Molla Bjurstedt Mallory in 1918.

This was the final major appearance for two-time major champion Amélie Mauresmo, who lost to Aleksandra Wozniak in the second round. This was also the final major singles appearance of Ai Sugiyama, who was on a record-breaking 62nd consecutive major singles appearance, losing in the first round to Samantha Stosur. Sugiyama's record was eventually broken by Alizé Cornet in 2022.

Seeds 

 Dinara Safina (third round)
 Serena Williams (semifinals)
 Venus Williams (fourth round)
 Elena Dementieva (second round)
 Jelena Janković (second round)
 Svetlana Kuznetsova (fourth round)
 Vera Zvonareva (fourth round)
 Victoria Azarenka (third round)
 Caroline Wozniacki (final)
 Flavia Pennetta (quarterfinals)
 Ana Ivanovic (first round)
 Agnieszka Radwańska (second round)
 Nadia Petrova (fourth round)
 Marion Bartoli (second round)
 Samantha Stosur (second round)
 Virginie Razzano (first round)

 Amélie Mauresmo (second round)
 Li Na (quarterfinals)
 Patty Schnyder (second round)
 Anabel Medina Garrigues (second round)
 Zheng Jie (third round)
 Daniela Hantuchová (fourth round)
 Sabine Lisicki (second round)
 Sorana Cîrstea (third round)
 Kaia Kanepi (first round)
 Francesca Schiavone (fourth round)
 Alisa Kleybanova (first round)
 Sybille Bammer (first round)
 Maria Sharapova (third round)
 Alona Bondarenko (second round)
 Elena Vesnina (third round)
 Ágnes Szávay (first round)

Qualifying

Draw

Finals

Top half

Section 1

Section 2

Section 3

Section 4

Bottom half

Section 5

Section 6

Section 7

Section 8

Championship match statistics

References

External links 
 Draws
2009 US Open – Women's draws and results at the International Tennis Federation

Women's Singles
US Open (tennis) by year – Women's singles
2009 in women's tennis
2009 in American women's sports